Linguatulidae is a family of crustaceans belonging to the order Porocephalida.

Genera
There following genera are recognised in the family Linguatulidae:
 Linguatula Frölich, 1789
 Neolinguatula Haffner & Rack, 1969
 Tetragulus Bosc, 1811

References

Crustacean families
Taxa named by Samuel Stehman Haldeman